Angluo (Hhaqlol,) is a Southern Loloish language of Yunnan, China. Angluo is spoken in Jinping Miao, Yao, and Dai Autonomous County and Yuanyang County, Yunnan (including in Xinjie Town 新街镇).

In Yuanyang County, Yunnan, the Angluo are found in the four townships of Xinjie 新街, Huangmaoling 黄茅岭, Panzhihua 攀枝花, and Niujiaozhai 牛角寨 (Yang & Lu 2011).

The Angluo language has been documented by Zhang (1998) and Yang & Lu (2011). It is not the same as the Gehuo language, which also goes by the names Angluo and Gehe.

References

Jinping County Ethnic Gazetteer (2013). 金平苗族瑶族傣族自治县民族志1979-2010. 金平苗族瑶族傣族自治県民族宗教事務局編. 雲南民族出版社. 2013年8月. 
Yang Liujin 杨六金; Lu Chaogui 卢朝贵. 2011. 国际哈尼/阿卡区域文化调查: 中国元阳县新街哈尼族昂倮人文化实录. Kunming: Yunnan People's Press 云南人民出版社.  (Angluo 昂倮 people of Xinjie Town 新街镇, Yuanyang County)
You Weiqiong [尤伟琼]. 2013. Classifying ethnic groups of Yunnan [云南民族识别研究]. Beijing: Nationalities Press [民族出版社].
Zhang Peizhi [张佩芝]. 1998. Comparative vocabulary of Ha-Ya dialects [哈尼语哈雅方言土语词汇对照]. Kunming: Yunnan People's Press [云南民族出版社].

Southern Loloish languages
Languages of Yunnan